Mohammad bin Rashid Gardens was an environmentally friendly project designed for Dubai, UAE. The project was the first of its kind. It would have preserved and protected the environment and help to green the emirate of Dubai. It would have covered 800 million Sq ft and cost USD 55 billion (AED 200 billion). As a result of the Global Financial crisis of 2007–2008, the project was put on hold in 2008. In 2012, the project was scaled down and redesigned as Mohammed bin Rashid City.

Elements

House of Wisdom or Bait Al Hikma
The House of Wisdom (Bait Al Hikma) included offices, a library, knowledge parks, international organisations, international universities and colleges for science and history and Sheikh Mohammed's grand mosque.

Humanitarian House
The Humanitarian House included the Mohammed bin Rashid Al Maktoum Charitable and Humanitarian Foundation, UNICEF, museums and charitable foundations.

House of Nature
The nature house included family parks, world parks, laboratories, natural sciences institutions and colleges, hotels, clubs, a zoo, flower gardens and herbal medicine clinics. It was to also encompass a family resort, wildlife parks and zoological research centres.

House of Trade
The trade district included centres for trademark agents, institutes of higher finance and banking, insurance companies, and Islamic and international banks.

Gardens
The Gardens included large green parks.

Canals
The canal is named Union canal and was to extend from Dubai Creek. The canal ran through the entire development.

Centre
The centre included orbit around the garden ring. The centre surrounded House of Humanity with circular lakes connected by branches of Union canal.

See also
List of development projects in Dubai

References

External links
Go-green.ae
Flashydubai.com
Civicarts.com

Buildings and structures under construction in Dubai
Gardens in the United Arab Emirates
Canals in the United Arab Emirates